Henri Pichette (1924–2000) was a French writer and poet.

Works

Xylophonie (with Antonin Artaud), 1946
Apoèmes, Gallimard, 1947
Les Epiphanies, Gallimard, 1948
Rond-Point, Joyce regular part au futur and pour Pages Chaplin, Mercure de France, 1950
Lettres Arc-en-Ciel, Lettre rouge, with the response from Max-Pol Fouchet, Lettre Orangée with André Breton, L'Arche, 1950
Le Point vélique, Mercure de France, 1950
Nuclear, L'Arche, 1952
Les Revendications, Mercure de France, 1958
Odes à chacun, Gallimard, 1961
Tombeau de Gérard Philipe, Gallimard, 1961
Dents de lait, dents de loup, Gallimard 1962
Epiphanies, definitive edition, Poetry / Gallimard, 1969
Poèmes offerts, Granit, 1982, Gallimard, 2009
Notebooks Henri Pichette 1: Défense et illustration, Granit, 1991
Notebooks Henri Pichette 2: Les Enfances Granit 1995
Apoèmes, regular Lambeaux d'un amour et d'manuscrit Fragments du "Sélénite" Poetry / Gallimard, 1995
Notebooks Henri Pichette 3: with Les Epiphanies, The Rubeline, 1997
Dents de lait, dents de loup, novel, 2005 edition
Les Ditelis du rouge-gorge, Gallimard, 2005

References

1924 births
2000 deaths
20th-century French poets
French male poets
20th-century French male writers